Pokémon XD: Gale of Darkness, released in Japan as , is a role-playing video game, part of the Pokémon franchise, released for the GameCube. It is the successor of the GameCube game Pokémon Colosseum. The game takes place in Orre, the setting of Pokémon Colosseums adventure mode. All of the Game Boy Advance Pokémon games can connect to this game through trading and Battle Mode.

Gameplay

Shadow Pokémon
The main focus of the game, like its predecessor, is to capture Shadow Pokémon and fight with them and also file up their information in pokedex. Shadow Pokémon are captured using the Snag Machine, as in Pokémon Colosseum. In this game there are 83 different Shadow Pokémon to collect. Each Shadow Pokémon has a set of Shadow moves that it knows to give it more variety in combat, which is a significant change from Pokémon Colosseum. Shadow moves can be either physical or special, which is the only type of move that was capable of this in Generation III. This changed once Generation IV brought physical and special moves for each type. These moves often have lower power than their non-Suspicious counterparts, but still inflict more damage due to being super effective. Their usefulness is also increased by not having to use PP when you use a move, as they can be used as often as needed within a single battle. If at some point in the game the player cannot catch a Shadow Pokémon, there is a second chance available: at random points throughout the game an antagonist, Miror B. will appear and have a Shadow Pokémon that the player was not able to catch. Once the player has obtained 82 of the Shadow Pokémon, Miror B. will appear one final time with the final obtainable Shadow Pokémon in the game.

Purifying Shadow Pokémon
Once a Shadow Pokémon is captured the player then has to purify it. There are two different ways of purifying Pokémon: one way is to use the Purification Chamber, and the other is to carry the Pokémon in the party just like in Pokémon Colosseum. The Purification Chamber allows the player to place anywhere from 1 to 4 Pokémon in a circle and a Shadow Pokémon is placed in the center of this circle. Depending on the Pokémon that are placed in the circle the tempo will increase, which increases the speed of purifying the Shadow Pokémon. After that the Shadow Pokémon will be purified as the player walks around, and they will be notified when a Shadow Pokémon is ready to be purified. When the player carries the Pokémon in the party and battles with them, they will gain experience when they are purified. If the Purification Chamber is used then the Pokémon will not gain any experience, but with the Purification Chamber multiple Pokémon can be purified at the same time.

Mt. Battle
The Mt. Battle area is an area that is accessible early on in the game and is a 100 trainer challenge. The 100 battles are split into 10 battles in 10 different zones with the trainers in each zone being stronger than the ones in the zone before. The tenth trainer in each zone is called the Area Leader, and after each Area Leader is defeated the player gets a specific number of pokecoupons. When the player defeats an Area Leader the first time the player gets a special item. At the front desk Mt. Battle the player can exchange their pokecoupons for certain prizes.

Poke Spots
One other new aspect to the game is that there are three different PokeSpots throughout the game. At these special locations the player can lay Poke snacks in the area to cause wild Pokémon to appear. At these 3 locations 9 different wild Pokémon can be captured and they can be traded for rare Pokémon.

Story

The story begins five years after the events of Pokémon Colosseum with the introduction of The Hero (named Michael by default) as the main protagonist. Michael talks to Professor Krane, his mother's boss, who introduces the concept of Shadow Pokémon, which are Pokémon whose hearts have been artificially closed. The criminal syndicate Team Cipher is creating and distributing them for their evil purposes. Krane also introduces the Snag Machine, which is used to capture Shadow Pokémon to purify. Krane entrusts Michael with the Snag Machine to capture these Shadow Pokémon and is given the Aura Reader (the eye piece) to identify them from normal Pokémon.

Shortly after this, Krane is kidnapped by Cipher agents. Michael goes after the Cipher Agents to rescue Krane, and soon is led on many adventures throughout Orre. He must defeat the Cipher Peons and Admins and rescue the shadow Pokémon to save Orre from the evil Cipher.  At the end of the game, he must get to Citadark Isle and battle the main villain: Master Greevil, who, in the beginning of the game, was thinly disguised as an old rich man named Mr. Verich.  After Michael defeats Greevil
and snags his shadow Pokémon, he must purify all of them, including the (seemingly) impossible to purify Shadow Lugia. After all of the Pokémon are purified, Michael returns home and puts down his snag machine, but he stores it safely in his room to be used if it is ever needed again.

Development and marketing

In March 2005, Nintendo of America executive Reggie Fils-Aimé said that Pokémon XD would be a new GameCube game, but not a sequel to Colosseum. He said that the gameplay would be more similar to the Game Boy Advance role-playing video games Pokémon Ruby and Sapphire.

Japanese gaming magazines Famitsu and CoroCoro Comic later gave screenshots and information that revealed that the game would have 3D graphics similar to those of its predecessor, Pokémon Colosseum. It was also revealed that the game would continue the inclusion of Shadow Pokémon and snagging from Colosseum. Nothing of the plot was revealed, other than the fact that a black Shadow Lugia was said to play a large part in the story. It was also revealed that the player starts with an Eevee, and that the levels progress more closely to the main handheld series. The Eevee that you are given by default can evolve into any of five Pokémon, Vaporeon, Flareon, Jolteon, Umbreon, or Espeon. Towards the start of the game when the player must enter the parts shop, there is a man who will give you any of the five evolution-inducers: Sun Shard, Moon Shard, Water Stone, Fire Stone, or Thunder Stone.

Nintendo released two demos to promote the game. In the demo released to retail stores, the player goes through two battles where the player can snag three Shadow Pokémon. The second demo was playable on the "Pokémon Rocks America" tour.

This game features two Sinnoh related Pokémon species from the Diamond and Pearl generation introduced in Pokémon: Destiny Deoxys, both of which evolve into previous species. They are Munchlax, which evolves into Snorlax, and Bonsly, which evolves into Sudowoodo. However, they cannot be obtained in the Advanced series titles, because they lack the Sinnoh Pokédex, although the player can temporarily use Bonsly during one minigame.

Reception

Pokémon XD received mixed to positive reviews, usually scoring 6–7 out of 10 (8.6 out of 10 was its highest score).

The game was commonly criticized for having a large amount of recycled material from the earlier Pokémon Colosseum. This recycled material includes a number of reused areas, some recycled graphics and a modified engine. GameSpot commented that "not much has changed since the original".
Another common complaint were the Poké Spot areas, regarded as very limited and small compared to Ruby and Sapphire. While discussing the mixed quality of the Pokémon console games, Retronauts recalled it as an example. Gamepro magazine gave the game a mixed review, criticizing the gameplay being monotonous and lacking challenge. They also felt the game "doesn't have the pizazz for mature audiences," but gave praise for the game's flashy visual style of the Pokémon and their attacks, concluding “Gale of Darkness is not a terminally unplayable game by any stretch of the definition, but gamers are going to really have to love Pokémon in order to find gratification here.”

Like its predecessor, Pokémon XD was a commercial success, selling over 1 million units as of March 31, 2006.

References

External links
 Official North American website
 Official Japanese website
 Pokémon XD: Gale of Darkness at Nintendo.com (archives of the original at the Internet Archive)
The Official Pokémon Website

Role-playing video games
GameCube games
Video games developed in Japan
Video games set in Arizona
Video games scored by Tsukasa Tawada
GameCube-only games
Video game sequels
Genius Sonority games
Xd: Gale Of Darkness
Multiplayer and single-player video games
2005 video games
Games with GameCube-GBA connectivity